Friday Island is a Canadian comedy-drama television series which aired on CBC Television from 1962 to 1963.

Premise
This Vancouver-produced series was set on the fictional Friday Island in British Columbia where the Granger family has moved from Ottawa to establish a tourist lodge. The Granger parents (Lillian Carlson, Walter Marsh) and their sons Stephen (Mark de Courcey) and Tadpole (Kevin Burchett) were joined by Grandpa (James Onley), Aunt Sophie (Rae Brown) and Aunt Vi (Mildred Franklin). The Grangers were joined by other residents such as young Boomer (Reagh Cooper). Archie (Robert Clothier) and Barbara Tremain (Niki Lipman) jointly owned the community's general store, but a picket fence divided the store with Barbara operating the post office side while Archie minded the store portion.

Scheduling
This half-hour series was broadcast Fridays at 5:30 p.m. from 19 October 1962 to 12 April 1963.

References

External links
 
 

1962 Canadian television series debuts
1963 Canadian television series endings
CBC Television original programming
Television shows filmed in Vancouver